Hell's Five Hours is a 1958 American thriller film written, produced and directed by Jack L. Copeland. The film stars Stephen McNally, Coleen Gray, Vic Morrow, Maurice Manson, Robert Foulk and Dan Sheridan. The film was released on April 13, 1958, by Allied Artists Pictures. An industrial filmmaker and US Army combat photographer in World War II, the film was Jack L. Copland's only mainstream feature film.

Plot
Burt Nash is a labourer at a rocket fuel factory who is fired and beaten up by his foreman Jack Fife because he smoked a cigarette in a non-smoking area. Nash decides on revenge where he enters the rocket fuel factory by cutting through a security fence. Nash kills a guard, takes his service revolver and uses it to ignite one of the fuel tanks. He returns to obliterate the entire factory by making himself a human bomb with stolen dynamite after he abducts the wife and child of the head of the plant, Mike Brand to use as hostages. A plan is put into place where all the rocket fuel can be pumped out of the factory via a pipeline, but the process will take five hours. Brand is joined by an FBI Special Agent and a police psychiatrist to prevent the entire surrounding town from being destroyed by an inferno.

Cast          
Stephen McNally as Mike Brand
Coleen Gray as Nancy Brand
Vic Morrow as Burt Nash
Maurice Manson as Dr. Howard Culver
Robert Foulk as Jack Fife
Dan Sheridan as Special Agent Ken Archer
Will J. White as Al Parker
Robert Christopher as Bill
Charles J. Conrad as George Knight
Ray Ferrell as Eric Brand

References

External links
 

1958 films
American thriller films
1950s thriller films
Allied Artists films
1950s English-language films
1950s American films